Grand Kerala Shopping Festival (GKSF) is an annual shopping event in Kerala. The festival is conducted by Kerala's Tourism Department in co-ordination with the Industries & Commerce Department, Finance Department and Local Self Government Department. Through this shopping festival, the Kerala Government intends to transform the State into a hub for international shopping experience and there by Launch "Shopping Tourism" in the state. In the process, the brand image of Kerala Tourism would go a long way to help upgrade the infrastructure of traditional marketing center in Kerala.

Details 
The festival first started on 1 December 2007 to next year 15 January lasting for a period of 46 days with an aim to promote and develop commerce, trade and industrial sector of Kerala using the brand value of Kerala Tourism. The objective of the festival is to make the state an International shopping destination over a period of 5 years and create employment to develop traditional trade centers.

During this period stores and shops registered under the GKSF offer wide range of discounts, vat refunds etc.
Along with the guaranteed shopping experience, shoppers are provided with gift coupons for a fixed worth of purchase entering them into weekly and mega lucky draws.

The festival is a strong step taken forward to regain the lost glory of Kerala in the map of international trade and commerce. The Government aims to utilize the growth in the tourism sector to develop the state as an international trade and tourism destination. As compared to shopping festivals being held in other countries, this Festival converts the entire state of Kerala into a giant shopping mall, incorporating not just the big players, but also the small and medium scale industries.

Over 3,000 outlets selling jewellery, electronic goods, textiles, consumer-durables, cars and autos, as well as hotels, restaurants and shopping malls across the state register for this several days long Shopping Festival. The aim of the festival is to make Kerala an international shopping destination in five years on lines of Dubai and Singapore and thereby attract tourists in large number to the state. Regional hubs of commercial activity are being planned in major cities and towns for the shopping festival.

The 6th season of GKSF (2012-2013) also featured a contemporary art fair. The exhibition-come-sale featuring more than 300 works by over 200 artists was a first-of-its-kind attempt to address the lack of marketing opportunities for Kerala artists. The fair was inaugurated at Kanakakkunnu Palace in Thiruvananthapuram by Chief Minister Oommen Chandy with the sale of two paintings.

References

External links 
 

Shopping festivals
Retailing in India
Economy of Kerala
Festivals established in 2007
2007 establishments in Kerala